The 2021 season was the 19th season of competitive kickboxing in Romania.

List of events

Colosseum Tournament 23

Colosseum Tournament 23: Căliniuc vs. Bozan was a kickboxing event produced by the Colosseum Tournament that took place on February 26, 2021 at Colosseum Tournament Studios in Bucharest, Romania.

Background
A Colosseum Tournament World Lightweight Championship bout for the vacant title between reigning Colosseum Tournament World Super Lightweight Champion Sorin Căliniuc and reigning ISKA World Middleweight Champion Gabriel Bozan served as the event headliner.

A welterweight bout between two-division Colosseum Tournament champion Eduard Gafencu and Anghel Cardoş took place at the event.

A welterweight bout between multiple world and European kempo champion Mirel Drăgan and Daniel Bolfă also took place at the event.

Featherweight fighters Vlad Trif and Marian Lăpușneanu were set to meet in a title eliminator and a highly anticipated rematch of their Colosseum Tournament 21 bout from 2020, but Lăpușneanu failed to make weight.

Results

Dynamite Fighting Show 10

Dynamite Fighting Show 10: Stoica vs. Latifaj (also known as  Day of the Warriors) was a kickboxing event produced by the Dynamite Fighting Show that took place on March 10, 2021 at Silva Complex in Bucharest, Romania. 

Andrei Stoica made a special guest appearance at the event.

Background
A bout between former SUPERKOMBAT and Enfusion champion Bogdan Stoica and two-time ISKA Germany Champion Rinor Latifaj served as the event headliner. Stoica made return after two and a half years. 

An openweight bout between former Colosseum Tournament champion Florin Lambagiu and Ion Grigore served as the co-main event.

Current Dynamite Fighting Show Heavyweight Champion Ionuț Iancu faced former Colosseum Tournament Heavyweight Champion Costin Mincu (also former WKF Cruiserweight Champion) in a non-title heavyweight bout.

Results

Awards
Fight of the Night: Călin Petrișor vs. Serghei Zanosiev

Colosseum Tournament 24

Colosseum Tournament 24: Spetcu vs. Maxim was a kickboxing and boxing event produced by the Colosseum Tournament that took place on April 1, 2021 at Colosseum Tournament Studios in Bucharest, Romania. 

Ciprian Sora made a special guest appearance at the event.

Background
A featherweight bout between former SUPERKOMBAT Lightweight Champion Cristian Spetcu and Adrian Maxim served as the event headliner.  

Two-division Colosseum Tournament champion Cosmin Ionescu faced Vasile Amariței in a non-title super middleweight bout.

Results

Colosseum Tournament 25

Colosseum Tournament 25: Căliniuc vs. Matei (also known as  War Is Coming) was a kickboxing event produced by the Colosseum Tournament that took place on May 31, 2021 at ANL Hall in Cluj-Napoca, Romania. 

Semmy Schilt made a special guest appearance at the event.

Background
A Colosseum Tournament Lightweight Championship bout between current champion Sorin Căliniuc (also the Colosseum Tournament Super Lightweight Champion) and former KOK Lightweight Champion Vitalie Matei served as the main event.  

A Colosseum Tournament Featherweight Championship bout between the current champion Maxim Răilean and former SUPERKOMBAT Lightweight Champion Cristian Spetcu took place as the co-main event.

A super heavyweight bout between top draw Alexandru Lungu and Franco De Martiis took place at this event. 

A non-title welterweight bout between two-division Colosseum Tournament champion Eduard Gafencu and Flavius Boiciuc took place at this event.

A welterweight bout between multiple world and European kempo champion Mirel Drăgan and Valentin Sachelaru took place at the event. 

Former RXF champion Ion Surdu made his promotional debut under kickboxing rules in a welterweight bout against Laurențiu Negru. 

Anghel Cardoş and Mahmoud Sfef met in a welterweight bout. 

A super middleweight bout between top contender Vasile Amariței, and multiple champion of Morocco and Romanian-based Shakib Haroun took place at the event. 

2019 gold medallist at junior kickboxing ISKA World Championships Silviu Ionescu and Paul Cornea met in a featherweight bout. 

A bantamweight bout between top challenger Iulian Marinescu and Enfusion contender Rida Bellahcen was expected to take place at this event. However, their bout was scrapped just hours before the event started due to Bellahcen testing positive for COVID-19. They were then rescheduled for Colosseum Tournament 26 in July. 

A light heavyweight bout involving former Colosseum Tournament and Dynamite Fighting Show champion Sebastian Cozmâncă was expected to take place at the event. However, Cozmâncă pulled out due to an injury.

Results

Dynamite Fighting Show 11

Dynamite Fighting Show 11: Stoica vs. Voronin IV (also known as  Moment of Truth) was a kickboxing event produced by the Dynamite Fighting Show that took place on June 4, 2021 at Silva Complex in Bucharest, Romania. 

Bogdan Stoica made a special guest appearance at the event.

Background
A light heavyweight rematch bout between former SUPERKOMBAT Super Cruiserweight Champion Andrei Stoica and Pavel Voronin headlined this event. The pairing met previously at Dynamite Fighting Show 9 on December 4, 2020, where Stoica won via split decision.  

A middleweight bout between former Colosseum Tournament Light Welterweight Champion Florin Lambagiu and KOK Light Heavyweight Championship challenger Petros Vardakas served as the co-main event.  

Current Dynamite Fighting Show Heavyweight Champion Ionuț Iancu faced former K-1 World Grand Prix in Riga winner Konstantin Gluhov in a non-title heavyweight bout. 

Two-time Romania Olympic boxing champion Ștefan Lătescu faced Bosnian icon Dževad Poturak in a heavyweight bout. 

A heavyweight bout between former Colosseum Tournament champion Marius Munteanu and Sebastian Lutaniuc was scheduled for the event. However, Lutaniuc was forced to pull out due to injury. He was replaced by Florin Matei. 

A super lightweight bout between former Colosseum Tournament champion Andrei Ostrovanu and Cezar Buzdugan took place at the event. 

Former Colosseum Tournament World Featherweight Championship challenger Vlad Trif faced Romanian-based Serghei Zanosiev in a featherweight bout. 

A heavyweight bout between former Colosseum Tournament champion Costin Mincu and Florin Ivănoaie was scheduled for the event.  

Călin Petrișor and Bogdan Năstase were scheduled for the event. However, they were forced to pull out due to injuries.

Results

Bonus awards
The following fighters received 7,500 crypto bonuses.
Knockout of the Night: Andrei Stoica
Fight of the Night: Serghei Zanosiev vs. Vlad Trif

Road to Colosseum 1

Road to Colosseum 1: Mihăilă vs. Graidia was a kickboxing event produced by the Colosseum Tournament that took place on June 19, 2021 at PalaRovagnati in Milan, Italy.  

Due to local COVID-19 restrictions announced, the promotion was only permitted to host a limited capacity of 500 attendees.

Colosseum Tournament president Gabriel Georgescu offered contract to Francesco Maggio following his win. 

Road to Colosseum will host future events in England, France, Switzerland, Germany and Turkey.

Background
A welterweight bout between former SUPERKOMBAT light heavyweight title challenger Adelin Mihăilă and three-time FIBA world champion Ayoub Graidia headlined the event.

Results

GFC 7

GFC 7: Paraschiv vs. Baya (also known as  Romania vs. Netherlands II) was a kickboxing event produced by the Golden Fighter Championship that took place on June 24, 2021 at Silva Complex in Bucharest, Romania. 

Eduard Irimia and Ismael Londt made special guest appearances at the event.

Background
A GFC Intercontinental Light Middleweight Championship bout between SUPERKOMBAT Middleweight Champion Amansio Paraschiv and former Glory Lightweight Championship challenger Christian Baya served as the main event. 

A middleweight bout between Michael Boapeah and Serkan Çelebi took place as the co-main event.

A WKU World Light Welterweight Championship bout between former Mix Fight Championship Light Welterweight Champion Jan Kaffa and former GFC European Light Welterweight Championship challenger Petru Morari completed the group of title fights.

Results

OSS Fighters 06

OSS Fighters 06: Stoica vs. Granville (also known as  Filip's Final Fight) was a kickboxing and mixed martial arts outdoor event produced by the OSS Fighters that took place on July 16, 2021 at the Piațeta Cazino in Mamaia, Constanța, Romania.

Benjamin Adegbuyi, Ismael Londt and Tarik Khbabez made special guest appearances at the event.

Background
A super welterweight rematch between multiple-time national kyokushin champion Alexandru Filip and Levan Guruli took place at this event. They met previously in a bout at Superkombat New Heroes 9 on June 25, 2016, where Filip won by third round TKO. Prior to the fight, Filip officially announced his retirement.

A heavyweight bout between former SUPERKOMBAT and Enfusion champion Bogdan Stoica and John Granville headlined the event.

Current SUPERKOMBAT Middleweight Champion Amansio Paraschiv (also the GFC Intercontinental Light Middleweight Champion) faced former Enfusion title challenger Zahid Zairov in the co-main event.

Results

Prometheus 1

Prometheus 1: Cardoş vs. Crăciunică was a kickboxing and mixed martial arts event produced by the Prometheus Fighting Promotion that took place on July 22, 2021 at Horia Demian Arena in Cluj-Napoca, Romania.

Background
A welterweight bout between veteran Anghel Cardoş and APP Fight Night 01 tournament winner Mădălin Crăciunică was scheduled as the event headliner.

A featherweight bout between former two-time Colosseum Tournament Featherweight Championship challenger Adrian Maxim and top prospect Ionuț Popa took place as the co-main event.

A bantamweight fight between Colosseum Tournament bantamweight title contender Iulian Marinescu and former Colosseum Tournament Bantamweight Championship challenger Adin Panaite took place at the event.

Current Colosseum Tournament Bantamweight Champion Ciprian Sofian faced Victor Alexandru in a non-title bantamweight bout.

Results

KO Masters 9

KO Masters 9: Ristea vs. Balli was a kickboxing event produced by the KO Masters that took place on August 17, 2021 at Ambasad'or in Bucharest, Romania.

Helmuth Duckadam, Ismael Londt and Cătălin Moroșanu made special guest appearances at the event.

Background
A heavyweight bout between Cristian Ristea and Glory's Muhammed Balli headlined the event.

A lightweight bout between current SUPERKOMBAT Middleweight Champion Amansio Paraschiv and Lofogo Sarour took place as the co-main event.

Results

Colosseum Tournament 26

Colosseum Tournament 26: Cardoș vs. Boiciuc was a kickboxing outdoor event produced by the Colosseum Tournament that took place on August 20, 2021 at Corvin Castle in Hunedoara, Romania.

Semmy Schilt made a special guest appearance at the event.

Background
An interim Colosseum Tournament World Welterweight Championship bout between Anghel Cardoș and Flavius Boiciuc headlined the event. 

Reigning Colosseum Tournament Middleweight Champion Cosmin Ionescu faced Vladimir Ogorodnicov in a non-title co-main event.

Results

Colosseum Tournament 27

Colosseum Tournament 27: Căliniuc vs. Koprivlenski was a kickboxing event produced by the Colosseum Tournament that took place on September 20, 2021 at Antonio Alexe Arena in Oradea, Romania.

Background
A Colosseum Tournament World Lightweight Championship bout between current champion Sorin Căliniuc (also Colosseum Tournament World Super Lightweight Champion) and former Glory Lightweight Contender Tournament Winner Stoyan Koprivlenski headlined the event. 

A super heavyweight bout between hometown hero Alexandru Lungu and Adnan Alić took place at this event.  

A Colosseum Tournament World Welterweight Championship bout between the reigning champion Eduard Gafencu and current interim champion Flavius Boiciuc was expected to take place at this event. However, Boiciuc withdrew from the bout for medical reasons and was replaced by Anghel Cardoş.  The pairing met previously at Colosseum Tournament 23 in February 2021, when Cardoş won by decision.

Results

Dynamite Fighting Show 12

Dynamite Fighting Show 12: Lambagiu vs. Ostrovanu (also known as  Moroșenii vs. Rest of the World) was a kickboxing and boxing event produced by the Dynamite Fighting Show that took place on September 22, 2021 at Lascăr Pană Arena in Baia Mare, Romania.

Background
A welterweight bout between former Colosseum Tournament Light Welterweight Champion Florin Lambagiu and former Colosseum Tournament Lightweight Champion Andrei Ostrovanu served as the event headliner.

A middleweight bout between undefeated Bogdan Năstase (who has the longest winning streak in DFS at 10 victories) and two-time European kyokushin karateka champion Ștefan Diță also took place at the event.

Results

Bonus awards
The following fighters received crypto bonuses.  
Fight of the Night: Călin Petrișor vs. Vlad Trif
Performance of the Night: Ionuț Popa and Florin Lambagiu

Urban Legend 11

Urban Legend 11: Invictus was a kickboxing, mixed martial arts and boxing event produced by the Urban Legend that took place on October 1, 2021 at Constanța Arena in Constanța, Romania.

Andrei Stoica made a special guest appearance at the event.

Results

Pitbull Fighting Network 1

Pitbull Fighting Network 1: Rusu vs. Panaite was a kickboxing event produced by the Pitbull Fighting Network that took place on October 8, 2021 at Fălticeni Arena  in Fălticeni, Romania.

Background
A bantamweight rematch between former Colosseum Tournament Bantamweight  Championship challenger Adin Panaite and Mihai Rusu served as the event headliner. They met previously in a bout at Colosseum Tournament 26 on August 20, 2021, where Rusu won by unanimous decision.

Results

Colosseum Tournament 28

Colosseum Tournament 28: Amariței vs. Van Oeveren II was a kickboxing event produced by the Colosseum Tournament that took place on October 25, 2021 at Ion Constantinescu Arena in Craiova, Romania.

Background
A middleweight rematch between Vasile Amariței and Jimi Van Oeveren served as the event headliner. They met previously in a bout at Colosseum Tournament 14 on July 20, 2019, where Van Oeveren pulled off the upset with a second-round KO.

Results

Superkombat Universe

Superkombat Universe: Doumbé vs. Emiev (also known as  Superkombat World Grand Prix in Dubai or as SK 60) was a pay-per-view kickboxing and mixed martial arts event produced by the Superkombat Fighting Championship (SUPERKOMBAT) that took place on November 1, 2021 at La Perle in Dubai, UAE.

Background
Former two-time Glory Welterweight Champion and Glory's No. 1 pound for pound kickboxer Cédric Doumbé made his promotional debut and MMA debut against Arbi Emiev in a welterweight bout. Four kickboxing title fights also headlined the event.

Results

Bonus awards
The following fighters have received 50,000 Superkoin bonuses.
Knockout of the Night: Cédric Doumbé, Mohamed Monteur El Mesbahi and Jhonata Diniz

OSS Fighters 07

OSS Fighters 07: Ristea vs. Tariq was a kickboxing event produced by the OSS Fighters that took place on November 19, 2021 at Constanța Arena in Constanța, Romania.

Cătălin Moroșanu made a special guest appearance at the event.

Background
A heavyweight rematch between Fabio Kwasi and Cristian Ristea was expected to serve as the initial event headliner. However, Kwasi pulled out due to injury. Mike's Gym's Kevin Tariq replaced Kwasi.

A lightweight bout between the former Colosseum Tournament World Lightweight Champion Cristian Milea and former ISKA Intercontinental Super Welterweight Champion Chris Wunn took place as the co-main event.

Results

Colosseum Tournament 29

Colosseum Tournament 29: Marinescu vs. Rusu was a kickboxing event produced by the Colosseum Tournament that took place on December 14, 2021 at Arad Arena in Arad, Romania.

Background
A Colosseum Tournament World Bantamweight Championship bout for the vacant title between former ISKA and WKF junior world champion (also former WAKO junior vice-world champion) Iulian Marinescu and unbeaten Mihai Rusu headlined the event. Unbeaten Ciprian Sofian was previously forced to vacate the title due to injury. 

Two-division Colosseum Tournament world champion Eduard Gafencu and Colosseum Tournament World Featherweight Champion Cristian Spetcu withdrew from the event due to undisclosed reasons.

A lightweight bout between former KOK Lightweight Champion Vitalie Matei and ISKA World Middleweight Champion Gabriel Bozan was expected to take place as the co-main event. However, Bozan pulled out citing another injury and he was replaced by top welterweight contender Mădălin Crăciunică.

A welterweight bout between multiple world and European kempo champion Mirel Drăgan and Bogdan Takács took place at the event.

Results

Bonus awards 
Fighter of the Night: Iulian Marinescu

Dynamite Fighting Show 13

Dynamite Fighting Show 13: Iancu vs. Lătescu II (also known as Night of Champions) is an upcoming kickboxing event produced by the Dynamite Fighting Show that will take place on December 15, 2021 at Silva Complex in Bucharest, Romania.

Background
A DFS Heavyweight Championship rematch between the current champion Ionuț Iancu and Ștefan Lătescu has been slated to serve as the event headliner. They previously met at Dynamite Fighting Show 8, where Iancu won by split decision.

A welterweight bout between the former Colosseum Tournament champion Florin Lambagiu and former Enfusion champion Robin Ciric would have served as the co-main event. However on December 2, Ciric was removed from the contest due to testing positive for COVID-19. He was replaced by the current FEA Welterweight  Champion Constantin Rusu. 

The event also features a one-night, four-man featherweight tournament, held to crown the first ever DFS Lightweight Champion. The tournament will be the first in the promotion since Dynamite Fighting Show 8.

A welterweight bout between the former Colosseum Tournament Lightweight Champion Andrei Ostrovanu and current FEA Welterweight  Champion Constantin Rusu (also former KOK Welterweight Champion) was expected to take place at the event. However on November 26, the bout was pulled due to Ostrovanu testing positive for COVID-19. They are now expected to be rescheduled for a future event.

Results

Lightweight Championship bracket

Bonus awards 
Fight of the Night: Ionuț Iancu vs. Ștefan Lătescu

See also
 2021 in Glory  
 2021 in ONE Championship
 2021 in K-1
 2021 in Wu Lin Feng

Notes

References

External links
 Colosseumkickboxing.com 
 Dynamitefighting.com
 Superkombat.com
 Colosseum Tournament on Facebook
 Dynamite Fighting Show on Facebook
 Golden Fighter Championship on Facebook
 KO Masters on Facebook
 OSS Fighters on Facebook 
 Prometheus Fighting Promotion on Facebook
 Superkombat Fighting Championship on Facebook

 
Kickboxing
2021 in kickboxing
Kickboxing in Romania